In 2009 Halmstads BK competed in Allsvenskan and Svenska Cupen, the club also had the possibility to play in the newly formed UEFA Europa League due to the team's 4th place in the Swedish fair-play table, Kalmar FF, Helsingborgs IF and IFK Göteborg where already qualified for European cups through the league and national cup, however Norway, Denmark and Scotland came ahead.

Squad

First-team squad
Updated 29 July 2009.

Youth squad

*

*

*
*

*

* = Can be called up to the First-team

Transfers

In

Out

Out on loan

Appearances and goals
Last updated on 1 November 2009.

|}

Friendly

Allsvenskan

Top scorers Allsvenskan

Matches

Svenska Cupen

Third round

References

External links
 Halmstads BK homepage
 SvFF homepage

2009
Swedish football clubs 2009 season